The term integral logarithm may stand for:
 Discrete logarithm in algebra,
 Logarithmic integral function in calculus.